Chronik der Wende (Chronicle: The Fall) is a German television series.

See also
List of German television series

External links
 

Rundfunk Berlin-Brandenburg
Ostdeutscher Rundfunk Brandenburg
1994 German television series debuts
1999 German television series endings
German-language television shows
Das Erste original programming